NCAC could refer to:

Australia
 National Cadet Advisory Council, the link between cadets and officers in the Australian Army Cadets
National Childcare Accreditation Council, a non-profit organization funded by and accountable to the Australian Government

United States
 National Capital Area Council of the Boy Scouts of America
 National Coalition Against Censorship
 Nevada County Arts Council, art council in Nevada County, California, USA
 North Carolina Arts Council, an organization that provides grants to artists
 North Coast Athletic Conference, an NCAA Division III athletic conference
 Northern California Athletic Conference, a former NCAA Division II football conference
 Northern Combat Area Command, a mainly Sino-American formation that participated in Burma during World War II